Earl Barton Gardner Jr. (September 18, 1923 – October 15, 2005) was an American professional basketball player.

A 6'3" (1.90 m) forward from DePauw University, Gardner played one season which started as the BAA and ended as the NBA (1948–49) in the Basketball Association of America as a member of the Minneapolis Lakers.  He averaged 1.8 points per game and was on the first team to win the NBA World Championship title.

After leading the New Market Flyers to 3 consecutive county titles, he graduated Valedictorian from New Market High School in 1941.  He attended Wabash College for a while, and then enlisted in the U.S. Navy where he became an Ensign assigned to the USS Cassin.  In 1946, he enrolled at DePauw University to complete his bachelor's degree. Later he received his master's degree from Indiana University.

Twice while at DePauw, he was named Little All-American, he led the Depauw Tigers in scoring for three seasons, scoring 683 points.  After his professional playing, he entered the high coaching ranks and spent 23 years as Varsity Basketball Coach and 33 years as a guidance counselor and teacher.

BAA career statistics

Regular season

Playoffs

References

External links

Full name and statistics from Lakers' Universe.com

1923 births
2005 deaths
American men's basketball players
Basketball players from Indiana
DePauw Tigers men's basketball players
Minneapolis Lakers draft picks
Minneapolis Lakers players
People from Montgomery County, Indiana
Small forwards